The Castello Monforte is a castle and defensive complex in Campobasso, Italy. It is located on a hill overlooking the city.

History

The origin of the castle is disputed. Some authors date the castle to 1459, built for -also known as Cola Monforte. Other authors date the castle to Norman times; a document from 1375 mentions a castle there. 

After the castle suffered damage during the earthquake of 1456, Cola Monforte refurbished the castle and surrounding structures and erected walls. During the 17th-century, the castle was abandoned and began to deteriorate. In the 19th-century, it was used as a temporary cemetery. In 1861, the castle was bought by the city of Campobasso.

In 2022, the Italian Order of Architects criticized the city of Campobasso for not involving directly the Order in the redevelopment project of the castle.

Gallery

References

Campobasso
Castles in Molise